Josefine Cronholm (born 1971) is a Swedish jazz vocalist, singer and songwriter, who has won two Danish Jazz Grammy Awards. Her debut album Wild Garden was released on 2002. She also provided a cover of The Carpenters' Close to You and an original song called "If I Apologised" for the film MirrorMask. She sang on the Django Bates Album Quiet Nights in 1998.

Discography

As leader
 2001 Wild Garden (Stunt)           
 2003 Hotel Paradise (Stunt)
 2010 Songs of the Falling Feather (ACT)
 2018 Ember

As guest
With ARC
 2013 Archipelago, Andersson/Russo/Cronholm (Gateway)

With Frans Bak
 1999 Natsange (Stunt)
 2007 Forbrydelsen (Universal)
 2016 Sound of North (Universal)

With Django Bates
 1999 Quiet Nights (Screwgun)

With Marilyn Mazur
 2002 All the birds (Stunt)
 2011 Celestial Circle, Mazur/Cronholm/Taylor/Jormin (ECM)
 2014 Flamingo Sky, Mazur/Cronholm/Jonsson (Stunt)

With New Jungle Orchestra
 1998 Giraf (Da Capo)
 2000 Zig Zag Zimfoni (Stunt)
 2004 Cheek to Cheek (Stunt)
 2009 Live at Skuespillerhuset copenhagen (Steeplechase)

With Steen Rasmussen
 2009 Amanha, I morron, Tomorrow (Calibrated)
 2015 Presenca

With String Swing
 2001 Red Shoes (Stunt)
 2005 Blue Hat (Stunt)

With others
 1997 Facum Est (RM)
 2001 Anker/Mazur/Crispell Poetic Justice (Da Capo)
 2005 Mirromask
 2006 Josefine Cronholm Easy jazz (Fønix)
 2007 Josefine Cronholm Nordic Voices (ACT)
 2017 Springet (film by Claus Bom, Music by Ida Bach Jensen)

References

External links
öresundsfolk

1971 births
Living people
21st-century Swedish singers
21st-century Swedish women singers
ACT Music artists
Stunt Records artists